West Spanish Peak is a high and prominent mountain summit that is the higher of the two Spanish Peaks in the Rocky Mountains of North America. The summit of West Spanish Peak is the highest point in Las Animas County, Colorado.

The Spanish Peaks are two large igneous stocks which form an eastern outlier of the Culebra Range, a subrange of the Sangre de Cristo Mountains.  West Spanish Peak is the easternmost 4000 meter (13,123 ft) mountain peak in the United States.  Due to its position well east of the Culebra Range and on the edge of the eastern plains of Colorado, West Spanish Peak enjoys great local vertical relief in almost all directions.  For example, it rises over 6,000 ft (1,828 m) in less than 6.5 miles (10.5 km) on both its north and south flanks.  Though not a fourteener, West Spanish Peak is the twelfth most topographically prominent peak in the state.

Geology
West Spanish Peak is an erosional remnant of a predominantly quartz syenite igneous stock which formed 24.59 +/-0.13 million years ago. It is the focus of over 500 radiating dikes.

Hiking/climbing
The standard ascent route for West Spanish Peak starts at Cordova Pass, a high pass to the west of the peak. From there, there's a rough path on talus (scree) up the southwest ridge of the peak for an additional . The trail is very braided and has a tendency to "go to the right" (which is into loose scree). If climbers stay to the left and close to the ridge, the climbing is much easier. At about 13,000 feet (4,000 m) is a large shale buttress to the right that usually has a small pool of warm water at its foot. Once up on the main part of the top ridge, it's an easy hike to the actual summit. To the north and south are very steep descents. At the summit is a large rock cairn with the usual PVC tube and "sign-in" sheet inside. This mountain is very unsafe when there is snow on the ground. Best time to climb: early June through late October. Thunderstorm and lightning activity can be high in July, August and September.

Gallery

See also

List of mountain peaks of North America
List of mountain peaks of the United States
List of mountain peaks of Colorado
List of Colorado county high points

References

External links

West Spanish Peak on Summitpost

Mountains of Colorado
Mountains of Huerfano County, Colorado
Mountains of Las Animas County, Colorado
San Isabel National Forest
Sangre de Cristo Mountains